Cefapirin (INN, also spelled cephapirin) is an injectable, first-generation cephalosporin antibiotic. It is marketed under the trade name Cefadyl. Production for use in humans has been discontinued in the United States.

It also has a role in veterinary medicine as Metricure, an intrauterine preparation, and combined with prednisolone in Mastiplan, an intramammary preparation. Both are licensed in cattle.

Synthesis

In one of the syntheses, 7-aminocephalosporanic acid (7-ACA) is reacted with bromoacetyl chloride to give the amide. The halo group is then displaced by 4-thiopyridine.

References 

Cephalosporin antibiotics
Enantiopure drugs
4-Pyridyl compounds
Acetate esters